JNES may refer to:

 An all-female organization associated with  NXIVM, a self-improvement organization accused of racketeering.
 Journal of Near Eastern Studies, an American journal
 Japan Nuclear Energy Safety Organization; see Nuclear and Industrial Safety Agency